Nicholas Mele is an American actor who has starred in many movies and on television. His first movie role was in the 1976 movie The Ritz. Other movie roles include Some Kind of Hero (1982) and Young Doctors in Love (1982). His most well-known film role was in the 1988 hit horror movie A Nightmare on Elm Street 4: The Dream Master as Dennis Johnson. A year later, he reprised his role in the hit sequel A Nightmare on Elm Street 5: The Dream Child. His most recent movie is the 2003 film The Great Gabble.

Mele has made guest appearances in many television series, including The White Shadow, Cagney and Lacey, Melrose Place and NYPD Blue.

Filmography
 1976 The Ritz as Taxi Driver (uncredited)
 1977 The Goodbye Girl as Richard III Cast
 1979 10
 1980 Wholly Moses as Israeli Photographer
 1981 All Night Long as Shoplifter
 1981 Mommie Dearest as Assistant Director #2
 1982 Some Kind of Hero as Officer
 1982 Young Doctors in Love as Jerry, The Gangster
 1984 The Lonely Guy as Maitre D'
 1984 Unfaithfully Yours as Waiter
 1985 Torchlight as Dr. Kameraman
 1988 A Nightmare on Elm Street 4: The Dream Master as Dennis Johnson
 1989 A Nightmare on Elm Street 5: The Dream Child as Dennis Johnson
 1990 Impulse as Rossi
 1991 Going Under as Wimmer
 1994 Fast Getaway II as Alejandro Mira
 1995 The Spy Within as Mailman
 1996 The Last Days of Frankie the Fly as Race Track Man
 1996 Pie In the Sky
 1999 Jimmy Zip as Oliver Sandstrom
 2001 I Am Sam as Booking Cop
 2003 The Great Gabble as Gordy Gabble
 2010 The Sinatra Club as Carlo Gamino

External links

Year of birth missing (living people)
Living people
Place of birth missing (living people)
American male film actors
American male television actors